FC Ata-Spor Bishkek is a Kyrgyzstani football club based in Bishkek, Kyrgyzstan that played in the top division in Kyrgyzstan, the Kyrgyzstan League.

History 
2008: Founded as FC Ata-Spor Bishkek.

Achievements 
Kyrgyzstan League:
9th: 2009

Kyrgyzstan Cup:

Current squad

External links 
Career stats by KLISF

Football clubs in Kyrgyzstan
Football clubs in Bishkek
2008 establishments in Kyrgyzstan